Kari Henriksen (born 1977) is a Norwegian politician for the Labour Party.

He started his political career in the Workers' Youth League in Nord-Trøndelag, and chaired the local chapter there from 1997 to 1999. He studied sociology from 1997 to 1998 at the Nord-Trøndelag University College, and media studies from 1999 to 2000 at the Norwegian University of Science and Technology. From 1999 to 2004 he was a member of Nord-Trøndelag county council.

From 2000 to 2002 he worked as a secretary for the Labour Party parliamentary group. From 2002 to 2007 he worked as a communications advisor. In 2007 he was hired as a political advisor in the Ministry of Labour and Social Inclusion as a part of the second cabinet Stoltenberg. He changed ministry to the Ministry of Health and Care Services in 2008, and was promoted to State Secretary in 2009.

References

1977 births
Living people
Labour Party (Norway) politicians
Norwegian state secretaries
Politicians from Nord-Trøndelag